The following is a discography of production by Hit-Boy.

Singles produced

Production credits

References

External links
 at Discogs
Allmusic credits 

Hip hop discographies
Production discographies
 
 
Discographies of American artists